The electro-kinetic road ramp is a method of generating electricity by harnessing the kinetic energy of automobiles that drive over the ramp. In June 2009, one of the devices was installed in the car park at a Sainsbury's supermarket in Gloucester, United Kingdom, where it provides enough electricity to run all of the store's cash registers. The ramp was invented by Peter Hughes, an electrical and mechanical engineer who is employed by Highway Energy Systems Ltd. The company says that under normal traffic conditions, the apparatus will produce 30 kW of electricity. Other proposed applications for the road ramps include powering street and traffic lights, heating roads in the winter to prevent ice from forming, and ventilating tunnels to reduce pollution.

The idea was dismissed as Talk of 'kinetic energy plates' is a total waste of energy in the Guardian  by David MacKay, the professor of natural philosophy in the department of Physics at the University of Cambridge. MacKay wrote, "The savings from parking at the green car park thus amount to one four-thousandth of the energy used by the trip to the supermarket."

References

Sustainable energy